Australia's Got Talent is an Australian reality television show, based on the original UK series, to find new talent. Seven Network announced that the show would be returning to their network in 2020 for its tenth season, however due to numerous COVID-19 restrictions, it had been pushed back until 2022. It had previously aired on Seven for six seasons from 2007 to 2012, and on the Nine Network for two seasons in 2013 and 2016, before returning to Seven in 2019. The judging panel consists of Shane Jacobson, Kate Ritchie, and Britain’s Got Talent judges David Walliams and Alesha Dixon. Ricki-Lee Coulter returned as host.

Production

Season 10 was originally scheduled to air in 2020, with filming set to commence in March 2020. The Seven Network announced a judging panel of Shane Jacobson, Manu Feildel and new judges Sonia Kruger and Olympia Valance with returning host Ricki-Lee Coulter. Production was however halted due to Covid-19 restrictions.

It was then confirmed that season 10 would air in 2021. In June 2021, Seven announced a new judging panel featuring Shane Jacobson with new judges Neil Patrick Harris, Alesha Dixon and Kate Ritchie. However, due to COVID-19 restrictions in Sydney the season was postponed once again. During Seven’s annual  upfronts, it was confirmed the series will air in 2022. 

Season 10 was confirmed to air in 2022. The judging panel consists of Jacobson, Kate Ritchie, and Britain’s Got Talent judges David Walliams and Alesha Dixon. Ricki-Lee Coulter returned as host.

The season was filmed during June and July 2022. Auditions took place at the Sydney Coliseum Theatre, while the finals were filmed at the Riverside Theatre.

Semi-finalists

Semi-final summary

Semi-final 1 (November 6)

Semi-final 2 (November 13)

Ratings

References

Australia's Got Talent
2022 Australian television seasons